The Gunther's  lizardfish (Synodus kaianus) is a species of lizardfish that seems to live mainly in the Pacific Ocean this fish species is extremely rare and so far only one specimen has been found in Hawaii.

References
 

Synodontidae
Fish described in 1880
Taxa named by Albert Günther